Gunsalus is a surname. Notable people with the surname include:

Catherine Gunsalus González (born 1934), American Presbyterian minister and historian
C. K. Gunsalus, American ethicist
Irwin Gunsalus (1912–2008), American biochemist